Stanard is a surname. Notable people with the name include:

Edwin Obed Stanard (1832–1914), American politician from Missouri
Jon Stanard, American politician
Mary Newton Stanard (1865–1929) American historian
Robert Stanard (1781–1846), American lawyer, judge and politician from Virginia
Steve Stanard,  American football coach

See also
Stannard, a similar surname